Heidi Kofod Jensen (born 14 August 1966) is a retired Danish athlete who specialised in the middle-distance events. She represented her country at three consecutive World Championships, starting in 1999, her best outing being the 2003 edition where she reached the semifinals.

She currently holds two national records, in the outdoor 1500 metres and the indoor 800 metres.

Competition record

Personal bests
Outdoor
800 metres – 2:01.11 (Stockholm 2002)
1500 metres – 4:07.17 (Kassel 2002) NR
One mile – 4:30.94 (Heusden-Zolder 2002)
Indoor
800 metres – 2:03.33 (Stockholm 2000) NR
1500 metres – 4:13.59 (Stockholm 2003)

References

1966 births
Living people
Danish female middle-distance runners
World Athletics Championships athletes for Denmark